Redemption may refer to:

Religion 
 Redemption (theology), an element of salvation to express deliverance from sin
 Redemptive suffering, a Roman Catholic belief that suffering can partially remit punishment for sins if offered to Jesus
 Pidyon haben, also known as redemption of the first-born, in Judaism

Politics 
 Redeemers or Redemption, the establishment of white Democratic, one-party rule in the U.S. South following Reconstruction
 The redemption movement, a debt and tax evasion movement
 Right of redemption, a right to reclaim foreclosed property

Arts and entertainment

Drama 
 guilt–purification–redemption cycle

Films 
 Redemption (1917 film), an American silent drama film
 Redemption (1919 film), an Italian silent film directed by Carmine Gallone
 The Redemption (film), a 1924 Italian silent film directed by Guglielmo Zorzi
 Redemption (1930 film), a talkie based on a story by Leo Tolstoy produced by MGM starring John Gilbert
 Redemption (1952 film), an Italian drama film directed by Piero Caserini
 Redemption (1991 film), a British television film by Malcolm McKay in the anthology series ScreenPlay
 Redemption: The Stan Tookie Williams Story, a 2004 American television movie
 Redemption: For Robbing the Dead, a 2011 American Western film
 Redemption (2012 film), a short documentary film nominated for the 85th Academy Awards
 Redemption (2013 film) or Hummingbird, a British action film by Steven Knight
 Redemption (2019 film), a Mozambique crime film
 The Raid (2011 film) or The Raid: Redemption, an Indonesian action/martial-arts movie

Literature 
 Redemption (Ali novel), a 1990 novel by Tariq Ali
 Redemption (Angel novel), a 2000 novel by Mel Odom
 Redemption (Fast novel), a 1999 novel by Howard Fast
 Redemption (Uris novel), a 1995 novel by Leon Uris
 The Redemption (novel), a 1936 novel by F. J. Thwaites
 The Living Corpse, a Leo Tolstoy play that made its Broadway debut as Redemption
 Redemption: The Myth of Pet Overpopulation and the No Kill Revolution in America, a book by Nathan Winograd

Music

Performers
 Redemption (band), a progressive/heavy metal band

Albums
 Redemption (Benzino album), 2003
 Redemption (Chris Volz album), 2007
 Redemption (Dawn Richard album), 2016
 Redemption (Derek Minor album), 2010
 Redemption (Ektomorf album), 2010
 Redemption (GRITS album), 2006
 Redemption (Huey album), 2010
 Redemption (Jay Rock album), 2018
 Redemption (Joe Bonamassa album), 2018
 Redemption (Josh Gracin album), 2011
 Redemption (Redemption album), 2003
 Redemption (Vomitory album), 1999
 Redemption (White Heart album), 1997
 The Redemption (album), by Brooke Hogan, 2009
 Redemption, by Before Their Eyes, 2012
 Redemption, by Useless ID, 2004
 Redemption, an EP by Walls of Jericho, 2008

Songs
 La rédemption, an oratorio by Charles Gounod
 "Redemption" (Gackt song), 2006
 "Redemption" (Jesse Jagz song), 2013
 "Redemption" (Shadows Fall song), 2007
 "Redemption" (Sigma and Diztortion song), 2015
 "Redemption", by August Burns Red from Messengers
 "Redemption", by the Devil Wears Prada from Dear Love: A Beautiful Discord
 "Redemption", by Drake from Views
 "Redemption", by For Today from Ekklesia
 "Redemption", by Johnny Cash from American Recordings
 "Redemption", by Muse, the third movement of "Exogenesis: Symphony"
 "Redemption", by Switchfoot from The Beautiful Letdown
 "Redemption", from the Rocky II film soundtrack
 "Redemption", by Jars of Clay from Furthermore: From the Studio, from the Stage

Television 
 Redemption (Stargate SG-1), a two-part episode of Stargate SG-1
 Redemption (Star Trek: The Next Generation), a two-part episode of Star Trek: The Next Generation
 "Redemption", the fourteenth episode of the BBC television series Blake's 7
 Redemption, the fifth volume of the television show Heroes; see Heroes (season 4)
 24: Redemption, a 2008 2-hour TV movie bridging the 6th and 7th seasons of the television series 24
 Chapter 8: Redemption, an episode of The Mandalorian
 Redemption (TV series), a 2022 detective television show

Other arts and entertainment
 Redemption (card game), a collectible card game based on the Bible
 Impact Wrestling Redemption, a professional wrestling pay-per-view produced by Impact Wrestling

See also
 Redemption song (disambiguation)
 Redemption value, in finance